A golfer is a person who plays golf. Below is a list of male golfers, professional and amateurs, sorted alphabetically. :Category:Lists of golfers contains lists of golfers sorted in several other ways: by nationality, by tour and by type of major championship won (men's, women's or senior).

All members of the World Golf Hall of Fame are listed, including those inducted for their off-course contributions to the sport. They are annotated HoF.

A

B

*Thai, so sorted by first name.

C

*Thai, so sorted by first name.

D

E

F

G

H

* Hsieh is his family name.

I

J

K

* Kang is the family name. 
** Kim is the family name.
^ Kyi is from Myanmar, and so is sorted by his first listed name.

L

^ Lee is his family name.
* Lin is his family name.

M

N

O

P

*Thai, so sorted by first name.

Q

R

S

T

*Thai, so sorted by first name.

U

V

W

*Wang is his family name.

X
None

Y

*Yang is his family name.

Z

*Zhang is his family name.

See also
List of sportspeople

Lists of golfers
List
Golf